Hero Hiralal is a 1988 Indian film directed by Ketan Mehta, starring Naseeruddin Shah and Sanjana Kapoor in leading roles. It is a movie about an auto rickshaw driver who falls in love with a film actress. The movie showcased performances by the lead actors and by Saeed Jaffrey and Satish Shah in their supporting roles. This marked Sanjana Kapoor's first leading role in a Bollywood film.

Synopsis 
Naseeruddin Shah is Hero Hiralal, a Hyderabadi auto-rickshaw driver who meets an upcoming Bollywood starlet, Roopa (Sanjana Kapoor) and becomes her tour guide. Soon, the two fall in love.

Work takes Roopa back to Bombay. Hero, pining for his lover, follows her and has an encounter with her family members, who clearly disapprove of him. Rupa's family tells her to reject Hero's love and move on with her career. Buckling under family pressure, Roopa is compelled to abandon her love, which causes Hero to fall into depression and attempt suicide. He is saved in time by Rani Sitara Devi, a show lady (Deepa Sahi), who arranges for him to die like a great lover in supposedly the greatest show on earth as directed by her. Hero is saved once again in the nick of time when Roopa arrives in a rush at the last minute to confess her love for him.

Cast 
Naseeruddin Shah – Hero Hiralal
Sanjana Kapoor – Rupa
Deepa Sahi	- Rani Sitara Devi
Kiran Kumar – Prem Kumar
Rohini Hattangadi – Roopa's step-mom
Saeed Jaffrey – Aziz Bhai
Satish Shah – Bhagwan
Mohan Gokhale – Rangeela Paintal
Johnny Lever – Police constable
Dilip Dhawan
Deepak Qazir – Dukhilal
Ahmad Khan
Rahul Chowdhary
Hosi Vasunia
Benjamin Gilani
Amitabh Bachchan (Spl. Appearance)

Music 
The film's music is by Babla Shah, with lyrics by Hriday Lani, and singing by Lata Mangeshkar, Amit Kumar and Kumar Sanu, as his first major Bollywood song. This movie Kumar Sanu song " Jashna Hai Mohabbat Ka" include on 6 January 1989.

"Sapano Ki Duniya Hai" (sad) – Lata Mangeshkar
"Main Hoon Hero Hero Hiraalaal" – Amit Kumar
"Jashna Hai Mohabbat Ka" – Kumar Sanu
" Sapno Ki Duniya Hai" - Kanchan

Box office reception 
Hero Hiralal had an average collection on box office.

Crew 
Direction – Ketan Mehta
Producer – Gul Anand
Cinematography – Faroukh Mistry, Jehangir Chowdhury
Choreography – Chinni Prakash, Jay Borade
Action – Ravi Dewan
Editor – Sutanu Gupta, Adesh Verma
Screenplay – Ketan Mehta, Gul Anand
Dialogue – Hridaylani
Sound – Jitendra Chaudhary
Costume – Bhanu Athaiya
Music - Babla Shah
Lyrics - Hriday Lani
Singers - Lata Mangeshkar, Amit Kumar & Kumar Sanu

References

External links 
 

1989 films
1980s Hindi-language films
Films directed by Ketan Mehta
Films set in Hyderabad, India